Casabianca may refer to:

People 
 Camille de Casabianca (born 1960), French filmmaker and writer
 Luc-Julien-Joseph Casabianca (1762–1798), French Navy officer
 Paul de Casabianca (1839–1916), French lawyer, Senator of Corsica from 1885 to 1903
 Raphaël, Comte de Casabianca (1738–1825), French general

Ships

A number of vessels of the French Navy are named after Luc Casabianca:
 French submarine Casabianca (1935)
 Casabianca, a T 47-class destroyer
 French submarine Casabianca (S603)

Geography 
 Casabianca, Haute-Corse, a commune in the Haute-Corse department, Corsica, France
 Casabianca, Tolima, a municipality in the Tolima Department, Colombia

Other 
 "Casabianca" (poem), a poem by Felicia Dorothea Hemans
 Casabianca (film), a 1951 French film

See also 
 Casablanca (disambiguation)